Homona parvanima is a species of moth of the family Tortricidae. It is found in Vietnam.

The wingspan is about 16 mm for males and 25–26 mm for females.

References

Moths described in 2008
Homona (moth)